In the Flesh is a BBC Three supernatural drama series starring Luke Newberry. Written and created by Dominic Mitchell, the show began airing on BBC Three on 17 March 2013 with the first series consisting of three one-hour-long episodes. Set after "The Rising", which is the show's take on a zombie apocalypse, the drama focuses throughout on reanimated teenager Kieren Walker and his return to his local community.

An extended second series of the show, consisting of six one-hour-long episodes, began airing in the United Kingdom on BBC Three on 4 May 2014 and in the United States on 10 May 2014 on BBC America.

In January 2015, BBC Three announced that In The Flesh would not be renewed for a third series due to cuts to its budget for its final year as a linear channel.

Premise
The show, set in the fictional village of Roarton, Lancashire, though filmed in Marsden, West Yorkshire, depicts life several years after "The Rising". This period, in (fictional) 2010, was a time when thousands of people who had died in 2009 suddenly re-animated as mindless, homicidal, brain-eating zombies world-wide.

However, by the time of the series, normality has begun to return. A full-fledged zombie apocalypse has long since been prevented by armed resistance from the living, especially from armed local militias who patrolled their communities and actively hunted the re-animated. Meanwhile, a scientific solution for the zombie phenomenon has been found, with the development of a medication to restore consciousness to the undead, allowing them to remember their time alive and who they once were. The surviving undead, not killed by the militias, have been rounded up, forcibly medicated, and entered in a government rehabilitation programme in a plan to reintroduce them to society. They are provided with contact lenses and cosmetics, to help them conceal their deceased status, and maintenance injections of medication to keep them from relapsing into a dangerous or "rabid" state. They are officially referred to as sufferers of Partially Deceased Syndrome (PDS), though anti-zombie hardliners prefer the pejorative term "rotters". Many of the risen are haunted by memories of the atrocities they committed while rabid. In the village of Roarton, PDS sufferers face prejudice from the villagers upon their return.

Cast
 Luke Newberry as Kieren "Kier" or "Ren" Walker, the protagonist of the series who is one of the many formerly rabid zombies who have been rehabilitated, and has since returned to his parents' home in the village of Roarton. A bout of depression over the loss of his best friend and romantic interest, Rick Macy, caused the 18-year-old Kieren to commit suicide. Upon his return, he is faced with the guilt of his suicide and the murders he committed whilst in his rabid state and those by his sister who now belongs to a militia dedicated to hunting down other PDS sufferers. Kieren tends to stay at home and avoid others to prevent being recognised as a "rotter". Over series two, Kieren gradually grows more confident both in his sexuality and in his status as a PDS sufferer, and starts a romantic relationship with Simon Monroe.
 Emily Bevan as Amy Dyer, a PDS sufferer who died of leukaemia at age 21. She meets and befriends Kieren and tries to convince him that their condition is a blessing. She is unaffected by her actions when she was rabid and believes that most people spend their lives waiting to die. In the second series she gradually becomes living again for reasons yet to be revealed, only to be murdered by Maxine Martin, who received intelligence to suggest Amy was the first individual to come back to life during the Rising ("the First Risen").
 Harriet Cains as Jemima "Jem" Walker, Kieren Walker's sister and a member of the local militia, the Human Volunteer Force (HVF). She has trouble accepting Kieren's return but still seems to care for her brother. She was especially troubled by Kieren's death as they were extremely close.
 Marie Critchley and Steve Cooper as Sue and Steve Walker, parents of Kieren and Jemima Walker.
 Emmett J Scanlan as the charismatic Simon Monroe who has links with the Undead Liberation Army (ULA) as well as being one of the twelve disciples of the mysterious Undead Prophet. Simon is the first undead upon whom the PDS treatment "neurotriptaline" had any effect, and, after his success led to the successful development of the drug, became one of the first undead persons to be rehabilitated, shortly after the invention of the term "PDS". After being disowned by his father, having killed his own mother in a rabid state, Simon finds a sense of community in the group of radicalised undead who adhere to the teachings of the Undead Prophet, which eventually comes to form the ULA. When he arrives in Roarton in search of the so-called "First Risen", he appears to be in a relationship with Amy, but later it becomes clear he is not interested in Amy and has merely allowed her to assume they are together. Over the course of series two, his attraction to Kieren grows into a strong romantic attachment, enough for him to place Kieren's wellbeing ahead of the wishes of the Undead Prophet, to whom he had long been devoted.
 Stephen Thompson as councillor Philip Wilson who later gets into trouble when he announces his romantic affection for certain PDS sufferers and, as a consequence, greatly diminishes his chances of climbing the political ladder. He later reveals his feelings for Amy Dyer at the village bus stop and they subsequently begin a relationship.
 Wunmi Mosaku as Maxine Martin, the honourable Victus MP for Roarton. Like members of her party, she does not consider PDS sufferers to be real people, and takes great delight in implementing aggressive new government policies which treat PDS sufferers as second class citizens. She also brings back the defunct Human Volunteer Force under a new name, the Roarton Protection Service (RPS), and stirs up once again the anti-PDS hysteria which Roarton had previously been under. Secretly, she has been studying the mythology of the Undead Prophet and has bought into its idea of a Second Rising. Having heard the prophecies of the ULA, she hunts for the First Risen, in the hope to slay him or her and trigger a Second Rising which will restore to life her brother, who died as a young child.
 Kevin Sutton as Gary Kendall, second-in-command and later Commanding Officer of the HVF Roarton village unit following the death of Bill Macy. Later, he heads up the RPS for Maxine Martin, and develops a romantic connection to Jem. After attempting to induce Kieren to an untreated state, in the unsuccessful hope that a rabid Kieren will be executed by Jem, Jem terminates their relationship.
 Gerard Thompson as Dean Halton or "Daz", an active member of the HVF. In addition to his position in the HVF, he later becomes second-in-command and in some ways Co-Captain of the RPS after its establishment.
 Ricky Tomlinson as Ken Burton, a local man who initially appears to dislike those with PDS but this turns out to be only a façade, part of his vain attempt to hide the fact that his wife is a PDS sufferer. His failure to keep this concealed eventually leads to her death at the hands of Bill Macy. At the start of the second series he has moved to the city, only to be killed in a ULA attack on a train.
 Kenneth Cranham as the widowed Vicar Oddie who runs the parish church and known well across the parish itself. He dies in the second episode of series two when he suffers a heart attack.
 Steve Evets as Bill Macy, the head of the HVF. He is Rick's father and husband of Janet. Bill learned of his son's romantic relationship with Kieren and forced him to enlist in the army to separate them. In the greatest sense of irony, Bill was indirectly responsible for both Rick and Kieran's deaths. During the "Pale Wars" he destroyed many "rotters" but when his son returns with PDS he cannot accept it and treats him as if he were still fully alive. Bill is forced to confront his feelings over having sent his son to his death, his son's same-sex romance and his son's return with PDS.
 Karen Henthorn as Janet Macy, Bill's wife and Rick's mother. She is very accepting of Rick's return and tries to convince her husband that Rick really has PDS and that his return albeit far from ideal is a blessing.
 David Walmsley as Rick Macy, Kieren's best friend and romantic interest, a young soldier who was killed by an IED during combat in Afghanistan, and whose reanimated body was recovered by the army relatively recently (wandering in Afghanistan). His return is a surprise both to Kieran, and to his mother and father; his father, an anti-PDS extremist, is particularly unable to cope with his son becoming a PDS sufferer.
Steve Garti as Duncan Lancaster
 Sandra Huggett as Shirley Wilson
Eve Gordon as Frankie King
Jack North as Rob Carnforth
Charlie Kenyon as Henry Lonsdale
Paul Warriner as Dr. Tom Russo
 Bryan Parry as Freddie Preston
 Francis Magee as Iain Monroe
 Steven Robertson as John Weston
Sue Wallace as Maggie Burton
 Linzey Cocker as Haley Preston
Harry Gawler as Man looking round house.

Episodes

Series 1

Series 2

Reception
In the Flesh received generally positive reviews, with praise being given to the series' premise. The Daily Telegraphs Simon Horsford praised Mitchell and called the premise "a clever idea", despite having initial misgivings over the continued use of zombies. Morgan Jeffery, writing for Digital Spy, called the idea a "risk". Comparisons were made between the show and previous shows aired on BBC Three: The Fades and Being Human.

The series launched with 668,000 viewers, the highest of all the episodes. The first episode was rated 3 out of 5 stars by Jeffery. Jeffery praised the performance of the actors and the cinematography, particularly highlighting the scene where Ken's wife is shot. However, he noted that there were times when "the two facets of In The Flesh fail to gel effectively". Overall, he believed it may not have "hit its stride" in the first week, but would continue to watch the show for the next two weeks. Den of Geek's Louisa Mellor also highlighted the scene with Ken's wife, and praised the episode. She said the story had a "reflective" feel, which distinguished it from other zombies stories.

The second episode received 392,000 viewers, a significant decrease from the first episode. However, critical response to the episode improved, and Jeffery rated the second episode 4 out of 5. He praised the banter between Kieren and Amy, as well as the appearance of rabid zombies toward the end. Mellor called Amy a "jolt of electricity on screen", and wanted to learn more about the thoughts of Bill Macy. Dave Golder, for SFX, also gave the episode 4 out of 5, and praised the episode's conclusion and rabid PDS sufferers. Golder felt Amy was occasionally "a little bit too broad", but praised her acting when Kieren reveals he killed himself.

525,000 viewers watched the season finale, an increase from the previous episode but still not as high as the first one. Jeffery rated the episode 3.5 out of 5; he praised Cains and her interaction with Newberry, and the death of Rick, but noted that many plots were left unresolved.

Awards
The series won the BAFTA for a Mini-Series in May 2014. Series creator Dominic Mitchell was awarded a BAFTA for 'Best Writer - Drama' at the British Academy Television Craft Awards ceremony on 27 April 2014.

The series was nominated for the GLAAD Media Award for Outstanding TV Movie or Limited Series.

See also
The Returned
The Cured

References

External links

In the Flesh (Season 2 Premiere)  at Doctor of the Dead
In the Flesh (Season 2 Episodes 2-5)  at Doctor of the Dead
In the Flesh (Season 2 Finale)  at Doctor of the Dead
In the Flesh (BBC Three Drama) at ReviewStream

2013 British television series debuts
2014 British television series endings
2010s British drama television series
2010s British horror television series
2010s British LGBT-related drama television series
BBC television dramas
Discrimination in fiction
English-language television shows
Horror drama television series
Suicide in television
Television series about families
Television series about teenagers
Television shows set in Lancashire
Zombies in television